The Zionist Organization of Canada (ZOC), originally known as the Federation of Zionist Societies of Canada (FZSC), was the first national Zionist society in Canada. Its stated purpose was "to organize mass support for, and actively co-operate in, the rebuilding of Palestine as a Jewish Commonwealth, and to foster interest in Jewish renaissance."

History
The Federation of Zionist Societies of Canada (FZSC) was established in Montreal in 1899 as a merger of several organizations across the country. By 1907 it had chapters in 42 cities and towns. In 1921 the Federation was renamed the Zionist Organization of Canada.

In 1967 it became a constituent member of the newly-formed Federated Zionist Organization of Canada (itself later renamed the Canadian Zionist Federation), and its head office was moved from Montreal to Toronto. Its functions were absorbed by the CZF during the 1970s, and was officially disbanded in 1978.

Presidents

 : 1899–1919
 A. J. Freiman: 1919–1944
 : 1946–1952
 : 1952–1956
 Michael Garber: 1956–1958
 : 1958–1962
 Joseph N. Frank: 1962–1964
 Daniel Monson: ?–1975
 Rabbi David Monson: 1975–?

References

1898 establishments in Canada
1978 disestablishments in Canada
Zionist organizations
Zionism in Canada